The 1885 Ohio gubernatorial election was held on October 13, 1885. Republican nominee Joseph B. Foraker defeated Democratic incumbent George Hoadly in a rematch of the 1883 election with 48.95% of the vote.

General election

Candidates
Major party candidates
Joseph B. Foraker, Republican 
George Hoadly, Democratic

Other candidates
Adna B. Leonard, Prohibition
John W. Northrop, Greenback

Results

References

1885
Ohio
1885 Ohio elections